Griogair Labhruidh (born 24 October 1982) is a Scottish Gaelic  singer/songwriter, multi-instrumentalist and recording artist from Gartocharn with strong roots in the Gaelic tradition of Ballachulish in the Scottish Highlands. After many years recording the Gaelic traditions of his local area, Gaelic became his dominant language and he is one of the few musicians who can speak and perform in a mainland Gaelic dialect, rather than the standard Hebridean Gaelic. Well-versed in the ceòl mòr piping tradition of his native district, Labhruidh is a member of the Afro-Celt Sound System and has also produced Gaelic music in very non-traditional genres, such as hip-hop and fusion. In 2014, Labhruidh became the main vocalist for the Gaelic supergroup Dàimh. He was Gaelic Singer of the Year at the MG Alba Trad Music Awards of 2015. 

He is notable for combining traditional Gaelic poetry and music with modern elements and themes. For example, Griogair Labhruidh performed Jacobite war poet Alasdair mac Mhaighstir Alasdair's Òran Eile don Phrionnsa ("Another Song to the Prince"), titled by its first line Moch sa Mhadainn 's Mi a' Dùsgadh, ​as part of the Soundtrack for the 2nd Season of the TV series Outlander. He penned lyrics and was a featured singer on main title theme of Outlander in its 6th season.

Labhruidh was a Ph.D. candidate at the National University of Ireland; his dissertation "challenges the influences of cultural colonisation upon the Gaelic singing tradition of Scotland". In addition, he runs a croft in the Ballachulish area of the Scottish Highlands.

References

External links
 official Website
 Labhriudh's official YouTube channel
 Profile on BBC Music
 Èolas Soundcloud
 Scotland Outdoors interview, BBC Radio Scotland

1982 births
Living people
21st-century Scottish poets
21st-century British male writers
21st-century Scottish Gaelic poets
Scottish Gaelic singers
Bagpipe players
Afro Celt Sound System members
People from West Dunbartonshire
Uilleann pipers from Scotland